The Mitsubishi 1MF9 or Mitsubishi Experimental Taka-type Carrier Fighter was a prototype Japanese fighter aircraft of the 1920s. It was a single-engined, single-seat biplane intended to operate from the Imperial Japanese Navy's aircraft carriers, but only two were built, with the type being rejected by the Navy.

Design and development

The standard carrier-based fighter of the Imperial Japanese Navy in 1926 was the Mitsubishi 1MF or Navy Type 10 Carrier Type Fighter, designed in 1921 by the ex-Sopwith British designer Herbert Smith. In April that year, a specification was issued to Mitsubishi, Aichi and Nakajima for a replacement for the Type 10, requiring the aircraft to stay afloat in the event of ditching in the sea. Mitsubishi gave the task of designing the new fighter to Joji Hattori, who had worked with Smith on the design of the Type 10. The resultant aircraft, the Experimental Taka-type (Falcon) fighter or 1MF9, was a single-bay biplane of wooden construction with fabric covering. It had a watertight fuselage and jettisonable fixed conventional landing gear to meet the Navy's ditching requirements (jettisonable because aircraft with fixed landing gear are very dangerous to land on water, since the drag from the water can easily flip the aircraft over when the wheels touch the surface), and was powered by a Mitsubishi Hi V-12 (licence-built Hispano-Suiza Lb). The pilot sat in an open cockpit, armed with two synchronised machine guns.

Operational history
The first of two prototypes flew in July 1927, being the first Japanese designed carrier-based fighter to fly, with the second following in September. It was not successful, with the design proposed by Nakajima, a modified version of the British Gloster Gamecock fighter being chosen for production as the Nakajima A1N, despite the fact that Nakajima and Gloster had chosen to ignore the requirement for easy ditching, allowing a lighter and more manoeuvrable aircraft.

Specifications

See also

Notes

References

Mikesh, Robert C and Shorzoe Abe. Japanese Aircraft 1910–1941. London:Putnam, 1990. .

1MF9
1920s Japanese fighter aircraft
Single-engined tractor aircraft
Biplanes